A quinoxaline, also called a benzopyrazine, in organic chemistry, is a heterocyclic compound containing a ring complex made up of a benzene ring and a pyrazine ring. It is isomeric with other naphthyridines including quinazoline, phthalazine and cinnoline. It is a colorless oil that melts just above room temperature. Although quinoxaline itself is mainly of academic interest, quinoxaline derivatives are used as dyes, pharmaceuticals (such as varenicline), and antibiotics such as olaquindox, carbadox, echinomycin, levomycin and actinoleutin.

Synthesis
They can be formed by condensing ortho-diamines with 1,2-diketones. The parent substance of the group, quinoxaline, results when glyoxal is condensed with 1,2-diaminobenzene.   Substituted derivatives arise when α-ketonic acids, α-chlorketones, α-aldehyde alcohols and α-ketone alcohols are used in place of diketones. Quinoxaline and its analogues may also be formed by reduction of amino acids substituted 1,5-difluoro-2,4-dinitrobenzene (DFDNB):

One study used 2-iodoxybenzoic acid (IBX) as a catalyst in the reaction of benzil with 1,2-diaminobenzene:

Uses
The antitumoral properties of quinoxaline compounds have been of interest.  Recently, quinoxaline and its analogs have been investigated as the catalyst's ligands.

References

 
Simple aromatic rings